Fredrick D. Schaufeld (born September 23, 1959) is an entrepreneur, venture capital investor, sports team owner, philanthropist and patent holder.

Mr. Schaufeld is a co-Founder and Managing Director of SWaN & Legend Venture Partners (SWaN). He is a Partner in Monumental Sports and Entertainment, which owns the Washington Capitals (NHL), Washington Wizards (NBA), Washington Mystics (WNBA), Capital City Go-Go (NBA-G) and the Capital One Arena. He is a Partner in the Washington Nationals (MLB), Team Liquid (e-Sports), the Professional Fighters League (PFL) and the Hill Top House Hotel, Harpers Ferry, WV. Mr. Schaufeld also owns American Bike Ride, parent of the DC Bike Ride. 

Prior to SWaN, Mr. Schaufeld founded and led National Electronics Warranty Corporation (NEW), which was acquired by Asurion in 2008 (now NEWAsurion). NEWAsurion is the world’s largest consumer product protection company, employing over 20,000 people worldwide. During his tenure, NEW was recognized by Inc. Magazine in its “Inc. 500” list of the fastest growing private companies in America. Mr. Schaufeld is the patent holder of the Rigid Insurance Form and a Founder and former President of the Service Contract Industry Council (SCIC), a national Extended warranty trade association that works with lawmakers across the country to develop fair and uniform regulation to protect consumers.

Mr. Schaufeld currently sits on the boards of Sugar23, Noodle Partners, Custom Ink, DuraStat, José Andrés ThinkFood Group, Mindshow, PFL, M34 Capital, Curator Solutions, Georgiammune and Telos (Nasdaq: TLS). He is an advisor to the boards of Cava, ClassEDU, Growcentia and Biothred. He previously sat on the boards of American Honors College, Anonymous Content, Asurion, Bio-Warn, Framebridge, KIND Healthy Snacks, NEW, OrderGroove and SocialRadar. 

In 1996, Schaufeld and his partner, Tony Nader, presented the financially troubled Best Buy Corporation (NYSE: BBY) with their concept: “Making Best Buy Even Better,” suggesting comprehensive consumer extended warranties could be sold without pressure or sales commissions at significantly lower prices than offered by BBY’s main competitor, Circuit City. The adoption of the controversial program led BBY to become the single biggest NYSE large cap turnaround/growth stock as of that time.

SWaN & Legend
Along with Anthony Nader and Cliff White, he co-founded SWaN Investors in 2006. Mr. Schaufeld is one of five managing directors of SWaN & Legend, a multi-stage venture capital firm that invests in high-growth, high-quality organizations and the entrepreneurs behind them. A few of the companies in which the firm has invested include Anonymous Content, Sugar23, Custom Ink, KIND Healthy Snacks,  Optoro, Quad Learning, Inc., José Andrés Think Food Group, Framebridge and UrbanStems.

Personal
Mr. Schaufeld is a recipient of Ernst & Young Entrepreneur of the Year Award. He is a member of the Economic Club of Washington, DC, the Young Presidents’ Organization (YPO) and its Peace Action Network Arab American Action Forum. Mr. Schaufeld has been quoted extensively in numerous publications and has appeared on CNN and NPR.

Mr. Schaufeld and his wife, Karen, live in Virginia and are active in organizations dedicated to education, health, environment, peace, inter-faith tolerance, military support and the arts. He is the chairman of the Inova Health System Foundation and sits on the board of the Wolf Trap Foundation for the Performing Arts. He is a member of Venture Philanthropy Partners and a supporter of the Schaufeld Family Heart Center of the Inova Loudoun Hospital; the Schaufeld Program for Prostate Cancer in Black Men of the Johns Hopkins University Hospital; the Fredrick D. and Karen G. Schaufeld Lower School of Loudoun Country Day School, Leesburg, VA; the Fredrick D. Schaufeld Scholarship program, Westbury, NY; Lehigh University’s Karen Shihadeh Schaufeld and Fredrick D. Schaufeld Endowed Scholarship Fund and Joachim Schaufeld Center for Jewish Life; the Emil and Grace Shihadeh Innovation Center, Winchester, VA; All Ages Read Together; 100 Women Strong; and the OneVoice Movement. He is a recipient of the Loudoun Laurels award and the Loudoun County Boy Scouts’ Good Scout award.

Honors and awards
Loudoun Laurels Honoree, 2018
Ernst & Young Entrepreneur of the Year Award, 1999
Insurance Form Packet Patent #4,874,187, October 1989

Organizations
 Economic Club of Washington, DC
 World Presidents’ Organization

Philanthropy
 Fight for Children, board member
 One Voice Movement, advisory board member
 Venture Philanthropy Partners, member
 Schaufeld Family Heart Center of the Inova Loudoun Hospital
 Fredrick D. and Karen G. Schaufeld Family Foundation
 Fredrick D. and Karen G. Schaufeld Lower School of Loudoun Country Day School, Leesburg, VA 
United Way Fredrick D. Schaufeld Scholarship Program, Westbury, NY

Current board membership
 Sugar23
 Noodle Partners
 Custom Ink
 DuraStat
 José Andrés Think Food Group
 Mindshow
 PFL
 M34 Capital
 Curator Solutions
 GeorgiaImmune
 Telos
 Biothred
 Cava (advisor)
 ClassEDU (advisor) 
 Growcentia

Previous board membership
 American Honors College
 Anonymous Content
 Asurion
 Bio-Warn 
 Framebridge
 NEWAsurion
 SocialRadar

Education
Mr. Schaufeld earned his BA in Government from Lehigh University.

References

American businesspeople
Living people
1959 births